The 5th World Freestyle Skating Championships were held in Geisingen, Germany from October 21 to October 23, 2011. 27 countries took part in the competition.

Medal table

References

Roller skating competitions
2011 in German sport
2010s in Baden-Württemberg
2011 in roller sports
October 2011 sports events in Europe